The Local Leo Cold Cloud is a relatively nearby cloud of interstellar gas.  It ranges from 11.3 to 24.3 parsecs in distance. The cloud's neutral gas temperature is around 20K, which is cold compared to the 1,000,000K temperature of the Local Bubble in which it is embedded. The hydrogen atom density in this cloud is 3,000 atoms per cubic centimeter, which is dense for interstellar medium. Thermal infrared radiation from dust in the cloud can be detected at 0.1 mm.

References

Interstellar media
Local Bubble